Methil Devika (born 1976) is an Indian classical dancer and research supervisor.

Education 
Devika completed a Ph.D in Mohiniyattam from Bharathidasan University, Tamil Nadu, 2014.

Awards 
Devika's archival film was voted into the Oscar Award Contention List 2018. She won two national awards (Ustad Bismillah Yuva Puraskar for Mohiniyattam 2007 and the Devadasi Award from the Minister of Orissa in 2010). She received the state honours Kshetrakala Akademy Award 2020 and the Kerala Sangeetha Nataka Akademi Award 2011.

She received the Best Dancer Award of the Mid‐Year Fest from Madras Music Akademy in 2016. She is empanelled into SPIC‐MACAY (Society for the Promotion of Indian Classical Music and Culture Amongst Youth) in 2010 She is empanelled artiste for Mohiniyattam at the Indian Council for Cultural Relations, Delhi, 2002.

Performances 
She has given solo performances in dance festivals in India,including Khajuraho International Festival.

She has performed at the Madras Music Academy, Mudra Festival and Nishagandhi Dance Festival. She has performed in Boston, New York, Texas, Philadelphia, Laos, Chiang Mai,  Sydney, and Melbourne.

Documentation 
In 2018, Devika created the short film documentary Sarpatatwam or The Serpent Wisdom. She set the lyrics to music, choreographed and performed the dance, also serving as co-director and co-producer. The film was voted into the contention list of the Oscars in 2018. It premiered at the Prestige Theatres, LA and was also screened at various international theatres. It was also the opening film at the NFAI, Pune. Her recent work Ahalya which was commissioned by Sampradaya Dance Company also opened to world premiere in May 2021. It was based on reflections in solitude done during Covid lockdown and the music and dance being composed by herself.

References

External links
Article on Mohiniyattam by Methil Devika

Indian female classical dancers
Performers of Indian classical dance
Mohiniyattam exponents
University of Madras alumni
Rabindra Bharati University alumni
1977 births
Living people
People from Dubai
Indian expatriates in the United Arab Emirates
Government Victoria College, Palakkad alumni
Artists from Palakkad
Dancers from Kerala
Women artists from Kerala
20th-century Indian dancers
20th-century Indian women artists
Koodiyattam exponents
Recipients of the Kerala Sangeetha Nataka Akademi Award